Phymorhynchus is a genus of sea snails, marine gastropod mollusks in the family Raphitomidae.

Description
The fusiform shell is thin, smooth, or spirally sculptured. The axial sculpture is less conspicuous. The siphonal canal is nearly obsolete. The columella and outer lip is simple. The anal sulcus is wide, shallow and close to the suture. The animal is blind, with a distinct muzzle into which the proboscis is retracted. The operculum is wanting. Type: Pleurotomella castanea Dall, 1896

Species
Species within the genus Phymorhynchus include:
 † Phymorhynchus agina (Olsson, 1942)
 Phymorhynchus alberti (Dautzenberg & Fischer, 1906)
 Phymorhynchus buccinoides Okutani, Fujikura & Sasaki, 1993
 Phymorhynchus carinatus Waren & Bouchet, 2001
 Phymorhynchus castaneus (Dall, 1896) - type species
 Phymorhynchus chevreuxi (Dautzenberg & Fischer, 1897)
 Phymorhynchus cingulatus (Dall, 1890)
 Phymorhynchus cingulatus Warén & Bouchet, 2009: secondary homonym of Phymorhynchus cingulatus (Dall, 1890)
 Phymorhynchus clarinda (Dall, 1908)
 Phymorhynchus coseli Warén & Bouchet, 2009
 Phymorhynchus hyfifluxi Beck, L., 1996
 Phymorhynchus major Waren & Bouchet, 2001
 Phymorhynchus moskalevi Sysoev & Kantor, 1995
 Phymorhynchus oculatus Zhang, S-Q. & Zhang, S-P. 2017
 Phymorhynchus ovatus Warén & Bouchet, 2001
 Phymorhynchus speciosus Olsson, 1971
 Phymorhynchus starmeri Okutani & Ohta, 1993
 Phymorhynchus sulciferus (Bush, 1893)
 Phymorhynchus turris Okutani & Iwasaki, 2003
 Phymorhynchus wareni Sysoev & Kantor, 1995
 Phymorhynchus n. sp. “CIR”
 Phymorhynchus n. sp. “SWIR”

Species brought into synonymy
 Phymorhynchus argeta (Dall, 1908): synonym of Xanthodaphne argeta (Dall, 1890)
 Phymorhynchus oceanica (Dall, 1908): synonym of Cryptomella oceanica (Dall, 1908)
 Phymorhynchus oceanicus (Dall, 1908): synonym of Cryptomella oceanica (Dall, 1908)
 Phymorhynchus tenuis Okutani, 1966 : synonym of Pararetifusus tenuis (Okutani, 1966) (original combination)

A new species described by Warén & Bouchet in 2009 under the name Phymorhynchus cingulata from methane seeps in deep water off the Congo River is a secondary homonym. It will be newly described under different name in the future.

References

 Dall W. H. (1908). "Reports on the Dredging Operations off the West Coast of Central America to the Galapagos to the West Coast of Mexico, and in the Gulf of California, in charge of Alexander Agassiz, carried on by the U. S. Fish Commission Steamer "Albatross", during 1891, Lieut. Commander Z. R. Tanner, U. S. N., Commanding, XXXVII and Reports on the Scientific Results of the Expedition to the Eastern Tropical Pacific, in charge of Alexander Agassiz, by the U. S. Fish Commission Steamer "Albatross," from October, 1904, to March, 1905, Lieut. Commander L. M. Garrett, U. S. N., Commanding. XIV. The Mollusca and the Brachiopoda". Bulletin of the Museum of Comparative Zoology at Harvard College 43(6): 205-487 + plates. page 258
 Warén A. & Bouchet P. (1993) New records, species, genera, and a new family of gastropods from hydrothermal vents and hydrocarbon seeps. Zoologica Scripta 22: 1-90.

External links
  Zhang, S-Q. & Zhang, S-P. 2017. A new species of the genus Phymorhynchus (Neogastropoda: Raphitomidae) from a hydrothermal vent in the Manus Back-Arc Basin. Zootaxa 4300(3): 441–444
 Bouchet, P.; Kantor, Y. I.; Sysoev, A.; Puillandre, N. (2011). A new operational classification of the Conoidea (Gastropoda). Journal of Molluscan Studies. 77(3): 273-308
 
 Worldwide Mollusc Species Data Base: Raphitomidae

 
Raphitomidae